Lusanda Badiyana (born 1 September 1996) is a South African rugby union player for the  in the Pro14. His regular position is eighth man, but he can also play as a flanker or a lock.

Rugby career

2014: Border

Badiyana was born and grew up in East London, where he also attended Cambridge High School. In 2014, he was selected to represent the East London-based  at the Under-18 Academy Week in Worcester, where he made three starts to help his side to two victories at the tournament.

2015–2016: Eastern Province Kings

After school, Badiyana moved to Port Elizabeth to join the  academy. He was named the vice-captain of the  squad that competed in the 2015 Under-19 Provincial Championship, leading the team on occasion when regular captain Jeremy Ward was unavailable. Badiyana missed just one match all season, starting in eleven of their twelve matches during the regular season.

In March 2016, Badiyana was included in a South Africa Under-20 training squad as they prepared for the 2016 World Rugby Under 20 Championship tournament to be held in Manchester, England. However, he failed to make the cut for a reduced provisional squad named a week later, instead linking up with the  squad that participated in the 2016 Currie Cup qualification series. Badiyana's debut season in first class rugby ended in disappointing fashion, as the team finished second-bottom on the log, with just two victories in their fourteen matches.

Eastern Province U21 won just one more match, however, and finished the season in fifth place, just missing out on the play-off semi-finals. After the season, Badiyana had a trial with the  Super Rugby team and he was included in their squad for the 2017 Super Rugby season.

References

1996 births
Living people
Eastern Province Elephants players
Rugby union flankers
Rugby union locks
Rugby union number eights
Rugby union players from East London, Eastern Cape
South African rugby union players
Southern Kings players
Xhosa people